Kirsten Han is a Singaporean journalist and social activist. In 2017, she co-founded the Malaysian-based online journalism platform New Naratif with Sonny Liew and Thum Ping Tjin, and served as its editor-in-chief till March 2020.

Activism
Han is mostly known for her criticism of the People's Action Party, the current governing party of Singapore, and its policies. She has advocated against capital punishment and co-founded We Believe in Second Chances, an anti-death penalty organisation in Southeast Asia, in 2010; in March 2018, she wrote an op-ed in The New York Times titled "What Trump Is Learning From Singapore — and Vice Versa", in which she claimed that Singapore was "an authoritarian paradise" and that "(b)oth the Trump administration and the Singapore government have little time for human rights".

Writing for the American magazine Foreign Policy in May 2020 as the COVID-19 pandemic was in its earnest, Han criticised the government's alleged "utilitarian, dehumanising approach" to the COVID-19 pandemic in Singapore, such as mandatory mask wearing and strict contact tracing.

In October 2021, while defending the proposed Foreign Interference (Countermeasures) Act (FICA), Minister for Home Affairs K. Shanmugam accused Han of "actively trying to put out misinformation" and cited her 2018 meeting with Malaysian Prime Minister Mahathir Mohamad, during which he claimed that she is engaging in foreign interference having "(urged) him to bring democracy to Singapore", despite the fact that Mahathir himself had curtailed civil liberties in Malaysia during his rule. Han was later served with a correction order under the Protection from Online Falsehoods and Manipulation Act (POFMA), asking her to correct false statements and misquoting Shanmugam.

Personal life
Han was born and raised in Singapore. She went to the United Kingdom to attend university, where she met a Scottish man named Calum Stuart and married in Scotland in 2014.

Han has also described herself as a feminist.

References

External links
 
 Stories behind the death penalty in Singapore | Kirsten Han | TEDxNUS

Living people
Singaporean journalists
People from Singapore
Singaporean democracy activists
Year of birth missing (living people)